The white-spotted guitarfish (Rhinobatos albomaculatus) is a type of ray. It is found in the eastern Atlantic from the Gulf of Guinea to Angola. It reaches a length of approximately 75 cm.

References

Rhinobatos
Gulf of Guinea
Fish of the Atlantic Ocean
Taxa named by John Roxborough Norman
Fish described in 1930